The Muppet CD-ROM: Muppets Inside is a PC computer game produced by Starwave in 1996. The title is a play on Intel's advertising slogan, "Intel Inside," meaning that one could find an Intel processor inside a computer marked with its sticker. The plot of Muppets Inside involves several Muppet characters getting trapped inside a computer. Bunsen sends Kermit and Fozzie Bear into the computer to rescue the others by travelling around the Bitmap on a Databus, continuing the computer parody theme.

Mini games
 Kitchens of Doom: A parody of Doom, with the Swedish Chef fighting giant vegetables in a crypt-like kitchen.
 Beaker's Brain: The player helps Bunsen unscramble Beaker's memories of Muppet Show clips.
 Statler and Waldorf: Two Thumbs Down: The player rotates boxes to unscramble Statler and Waldorf's video clip.
 Wocka on the Wild Side: In a parody of Missile Command, the player shoots down flying tomatoes that the audience throws at Fozzie Bear as he crosses the Muppet Theater stage.
 Death-Defying Acts of Culture: The player positions Gonzo's cannon so he flies through a target.
 Scope That Song: Clifford hosts a version of Name That Tune, with the songs played by Lew Zealand's fish or Marvin Suggs and the Muppaphone.
 Trivial But True!: A Hollywood Squares game, with Fozzie Bear as the center square.

The Muppet performers
 Steve Whitmire as:
 Kermit the Frog 
 Rizzo the Rat 
 Beaker
 Dave Goelz as:
 Gonzo the Great
 Waldorf 
 Dr. Bunsen Honeydew
 Jerry Nelson as:
 Statler
 Lew Zealand
 Floyd Pepper
 The Muppet Newsman
 Announcer
 Crazy Harry
 Frank Oz as:
 Miss Piggy
 Fozzie Bear 
 Sam the Eagle 
 Animal
 Marvin Suggs
 Kevin Clash as:
 Clifford
 Bill Barretta as:
 The Swedish Chef

Gameplay
This is the description of the game on the original packaging:

Notes
 The box describes Clifford as "the newest Muppet."
 A bonus "Muppetizer'" feature provided custom cursors, sounds and wallpaper.
 The game came with a 6x6 inch, 30-page booklet with Henson history, character profiles, game instructions and credits.

Reception

The editors of Computer Games Strategy Plus nominated Muppets Inside as their pick for 1996's best "traditional" game, but the award ultimately went to Power Chess.

In a retrospective review, PC Gamer praised the humor of the videos and game concepts, while criticizing the tedium of the small number of games.

References

External links
 
 Muppets Inside FAQ
 Muppets Inside on GameFAQs

1996 video games
North America-exclusive video games
Windows games
Windows-only games
The Muppets video games
Video games about amphibians
Video games about pigs
Video games about bears
Video games about mice and rats
Video games developed in the United States